The Arab Handball Championship of Club Winners' Cup also known Prince Faisal bin Fahd Handball Championship is an international club handball competition organized by the Arab Handball Federation, it concerne the club winners' cup of countries of the Arab World.

Results

GS Pétroliers (ex. MC Alger).

Winners by club

Winners by country

See also
Arab Handball Championship of Champions
Arab Handball Super Cup
Arab Women's Handball Championship of Champions
Arab Women's Handball Championship of Winners' Cup
Arab Women's Handball Super Cup

External links
10th Arab Handball Cup Winners' Cup - Tunis Afrique Presse (TAP)